Carlos Gilbert Herrera (born 16 April 1999) is a Spanish professional footballer who plays as a forward for UD Almería B.

Club career
Gilbert was born in Barcelona, Catalonia, and represented Santfeliuenc FC, UE Cornellà, FC Barcelona and RCD Espanyol as a youth. In August 2018, after finishing his formation, he was loaned to Tercera División side UA Horta for the season.

Gilbert made his senior debut on 18 August 2018, coming on as a second-half substitute for Ferran Tacón and scoring a brace in a 3–1 home win over UE Figueres. The following 31 January, he moved to another club he represented as a youth, Cornellà, also in a temporary deal.

In July 2019, Gilbert moved to RCD Mallorca and was assigned to the reserves also in the fourth division. On 3 October of the following year, he renewed his contract and was loaned to Segunda División B side SCR Peña Deportiva, for one year.

On 24 August 2021, Gilbert signed for another reserve team, UD Almería B in Tercera División RFEF. He made his first team debut the following 2 January, replacing Javi Robles in a 0–1 home loss against FC Cartagena in the Segunda División championship.

References

External links

1999 births
Living people
Footballers from Barcelona
Spanish footballers
Association football forwards
Segunda División players
Segunda División B players
Tercera División players
Tercera Federación players
RCD Espanyol B footballers
UA Horta players
UE Cornellà players
RCD Mallorca B players
SCR Peña Deportiva players
UD Almería B players
UD Almería players